Harold Ogust (1917-April 24, 1978)  was  an American bridge player who invented the Ogust convention

He was born and died in New York.

Bridge accomplishments

Wins

 North American Bridge Championships (4)
 Reisinger (2) 1957, 1963 
 Spingold (2) 1956, 1960

Runners-up

 Bermuda Bowl (1) 1957 
 North American Bridge Championships (5)
 Reisinger (1) 1945 
 Spingold (1) 1966 
 Vanderbilt (3) 1955, 1959, 1962

Notes

American contract bridge players
Bermuda Bowl players
1917 births
1978 deaths